The 1993–94 West Midlands (Regional) League season was the 94th in the history of the West Midlands (Regional) League, an English association football competition for semi-professional and amateur teams based in the West Midlands county, Shropshire, Herefordshire, Worcestershire and southern Staffordshire.

At the end of the season Midland Football Alliance were to be created. Ten Premier Division clubs joined newly formed league along with Midland Football Combination clubs, while Ilkeston Town was the last club promoted from the West Midlands (Regional) League to the Southern Football League. Thus, the league became Midland Alliance feeder and downgraded to ninth level of the overall English football league system.

Premier Division

The Premier Division featured 18 clubs which competed in the division last season, along with two new clubs promoted from Division One:
Darlaston
Knypersley Victoria

Also, Oldswinford changed name to Brierley Hill Town.

League table

Division One

The Division One featured 16 clubs which competed in the division last season, along with 5 new clubs:
Bloxwich Strollers, promoted from Division Two
Cheslyn Hay, promoted from Division Two
Manders, promoted from Division Two
Stafford Town, joined from Staffordshire Senior League
Walsall Wood, joined from Staffordshire Senior League

Also, Gornal Sports changed name to Bilston United.

League table

References

External links

1993–94
8